The White Lotus is an American black comedy-drama anthology television series created by Mike White for HBO. It follows the guests and employees of the fictional White Lotus resort chain whose stay is affected by their various psychosocial dysfunctions. It was originally envisioned as a limited series, but was converted to an anthology series, and has been renewed most recently for a third season. Both seasons have been well-received critically, with the first season having an 89% approval rating on Rotten Tomatoes, and the second season at 93%.

The first season received 11 nominations at the 2022 Primetime Emmy Awards across five categories, winning for each, including Outstanding Limited or Anthology Series, Outstanding Writing and Outstanding Directing for White, Outstanding Supporting Actress for Jennifer Coolidge, and Outstanding Supporting Actor for Murray Bartlett. It was also nominated for nine Primetime Creative Arts Emmy Awards across eight categories, winning a further five Emmys. It was the series that won the most Emmys across both ceremonies. For 2023 onwards, the series is expected to be ineligible for the limited series categories it competed in 2022, so will move to drama categories.

The series was included in the American Film Institute Awards top ten Programs of the Year list for 2021 and 2022. Coolidge is the most nominated actor for their work on the series, including Golden Globe Awards, Critics' Choice Television Awards, and Screen Actors Guild Awards wins. Cristobal Tapia de Veer is the most nominated crew member for her work as composer, including two Emmy wins. The second season also won the Golden Globe for Best Limited or Anthology Series, and the cast won a Screen Actors Guild award for their performances.

Total awards and nominations

Cast

Crew

Awards and nominations

Notes

References

External links
 

White Lotus, The
Awards